George Littlewood Hirst (5 May 1890 – 30 July 1967) was a Welsh international rugby union player. He was educated at Emanuel School in London and played club rugby for Pontypool and Newport and invitational rugby for the Barbarians.

Rugby career
Hirst made his debut for Wales on 3 February 1912 against Scotland. Under the captaincy of Dicky Owen, Wales won the game 21-6, with Hirst and fellow debutant Reggie Plummer scoring a try each. Hirst had difficulty holding his role in the Welsh team, and was replaced by Bryn Lewis and later Billy Geen. Hirst recovered his place the next year when he was again selected to face Scotland in the 1913 Five Nations Championship. Hirst was again on the winning team, but found himself dropped once more. In the 1914 Championship Hirst managed to hold down the role on the wing when he played in all four matches, losing only once, in the opening game against England. During the tournament, Hirst scored a further two tries and two drop goals.

Hirst's international career was cut short by the outbreak of World War I, but he returned to rugby when the war ended. He played in two matches for the Barbarians in 1919 before he sustained a broken leg in a charity game that ended his playing career.

International games played
Wales
  1914
  1914
  1914
  1912, 1913, 1914

Bibliography

References

1890 births
1967 deaths
Barbarian F.C. players
Newport RFC players
People educated at Emanuel School
Rugby union players from Merthyr Tydfil County Borough
Rugby union wings
Wales international rugby union players
Welsh rugby union players